Byrd Névé is an immense névé at the head of Byrd Glacier. It was named by the New Zealand Antarctic Place-Names Committee in association with Byrd Glacier.

References
 

Snow fields of Oates Land
Névés of Antarctica